James McGhee (born in Edinburgh, Scotland) was a Scottish soccer inside forward who spent at least four seasons in the first division American Soccer League.

Youth
McGhee was the son of former Hibernian player and Heart of Midlothian manager James McGhee, and the brother of National Soccer Hall of Fame forward Bart McGhee. McGhee's father was a renowned Scottish player who appeared with Scotland in an 1886 game with Wales. McGhee's father had a controversial term as the manager of Hearts. When he finally resigned on 6 December 1909, he began assessing his options. In September 1910 he decided to leave Scotland and emigrate to the United States. It took James McGhee two years to get settled and it was not until 1912 that Jimmy, his mother and brother Bart joined his father in the U.S. When they arrived in the U.S., the family settled in Philadelphia, Pennsylvania.

Playing

Amateur
McGhee spent at least one season, 1920–21, playing alongside his brother Bart on the front line of Wolfenden Shore of the Allied American Football Association.

Professional
In 1921, McGhee signed with Harrison S.C. of the newly established American Soccer League. In 1922, he moved to Philadelphia Field Club for the 1922–23 season. In 1924, he rejoined the team for two seasons.

Misspelled last name
Some sources list McGhee as Magee when he played for Harrison S.C.

References

American soccer players
Scottish footballers
American Soccer League (1921–1933) players
Harrison S.C. players
Philadelphia Field Club players
Association football inside forwards
Scottish emigrants to the United States
Footballers from Edinburgh
Scottish expatriate sportspeople in the United States
Expatriate soccer players in the United States
Scottish expatriate footballers